Celestino González (born c. 1926) was a Chilean boxer. He competed in the men's bantamweight event at the 1948 Summer Olympics.

References

External links
 

1920s births
Possibly living people
Chilean male boxers
Olympic boxers of Chile
Boxers at the 1948 Summer Olympics
Place of birth missing
Bantamweight boxers
20th-century Chilean people